Hanky Panky is a 2020 painting by Two-spirit Cree artist Kent Monkman. It depicts a laughing group of Cree women as they watch Prime Minister Justin Trudeau and Monkman's alter ego Miss Chief Share Eagle Testickle prepare for consensual anal fisting, while past Canadian leaders look on. Kent Monkman generated controversy by suggesting that the scene was a consensual act by including a reference to the hanky code.

References

External links
Painting at Kent Monkman Studio

2020 paintings
Paintings by Kent Monkman
Justin Trudeau
Portraits of politicians
Cultural depictions of Canadian men
Cultural depictions of politicians
Obscenity controversies in painting
Native Americans in art
Anal eroticism